Lal Ram Saran Singh was an Indian diplomat. He was the India's Ambassador to Italy India's High Commissioner to Malta during the 1960s.  He also served as Chief commissioner of the State of Pondicherry before its de jure transfer.

Offices held

See also 
 List of lieutenant governors of Puducherry

References

Notes

Indian diplomats
Lieutenant Governors of Puducherry

Possibly living people
Year of birth missing